Grave Decisions (literally The sooner you die, the longer you'll be dead) is a 2006 comedy directed by Marcus H. Rosenmüller which plays in the fictitious Upper Bavarian village of Germringen.

The film is about an 11-year-old Bavarian boy (Sebastian Schneider) who feels responsible for his mother's death, who died during his birth, and naively attempts multiple ways to reach immortality (procreation, reincarnation, sanctification, rockstardom) to prevent his tenure in hell.

Cast

References

External links

Films set in Bavaria
German comedy films
2000s German films